Wojciech Antoni Rostafiński (19 September 1921 – 6 July 2002), codename "Masłowski", was a Polish soldier in the Armia Krajowa during World War II and former scientist working for NASA. He was born in Warsaw.

In 1944 Rostafiński took part in the Warsaw Uprising as a member of Szare Szeregi (Gray Ranks-Boy Scouts) "Rygiel" Group.

For his bravery during the Uprising, Rostafiński was awarded the order of Virtuti Militari.

In 1953 Rostafiński moved to United States. He was manager of advanced research projects at NASA Lewis Research Center in Cleveland Ohio. During his career, he contributed to the theory of aeronautics and applied mathematics, and his work is listed in the Scientific Citation Index.

Honours and awards
 Cross of Valour
 Virtuti Militari (V class)
 Commander of the Order of Polonia Restituta (1993) 
 Commander of the Order of Merit of the Republic of Poland (1998)

External links
 "How the Last Jews in Warsaw Were Saved. Courtesy of Heralds of Truth", Michigan by Wojciech Rostafiński

1921 births
2002 deaths
20th-century Polish engineers
Polish resistance members of World War II
Polish Scouts and Guides
Recipients of the Silver Cross of the Virtuti Militari
Recipients of the Cross of Valour (Poland)
Commanders of the Order of Polonia Restituta
Commanders of the Order of Merit of the Republic of Poland
Polish emigrants to the United States